, son of Nijō Motohiro, was a Japanese politician who served as a member of House of Peers in the Meiji period (1868–1912). He adopted Nijō Masamaro's son Tamemoto.

References

 

1883 births
1927 deaths
Fujiwara clan
Atsumoto
Members of the House of Peers (Japan)